Candace Amber Owens Farmer ( Owens; born April 29, 1989) is an American conservative author, talk show host, political commentator, and producer. Owens has been recognized for her pro-Trump activism as a Black woman and her criticism of Black Lives Matter and the Democratic Party despite being initially critical of United States President Donald Trump and the Republican Party. She worked for the conservative advocacy group Turning Point USA between 2017 and 2019 as its communications director. In 2021, she joined The Daily Wire, where she hosts Candace, a political talk show. 

On several occasions Owens has claimed that the effects of white supremacy and white nationalism are exaggerated, especially when compared to other issues facing Black Americans.  She has expressed anti-lockdown views and anti-vaccination opinions during the COVID-19 pandemic. Owens has been criticized for promoting conspiracy theories, mostly through her social media profiles and television and media appearances.

Early life and education
With her siblings, Owens was raised in Stamford, Connecticut, by her grandparents from around the age of 11 or 12, after her parents divorced. She is the third of four children. She said her paternal grandfather Robert Owens, a Black American, was born in North Carolina. Owens is also of Caribbean American heritage through her grandmother who is originally from Saint Thomas, U.S. Virgin Islands. She is a graduate of Stamford High School.

In 2007, while a 17-year-old senior in high school, Owens received three racist death threat voicemail messages, totaling two minutes, from a group of white male classmates. Joshua Starr, the city's superintendent of schools, listened to the voicemail messages and said that they were "horrendous". Owens's family sued the Stamford Board of Education in federal court, alleging that the city did not protect her rights, resulting in a $37,500 settlement in January 2008. She has a TEDx talk on the subject.

Owens pursued an undergraduate degree in journalism at the University of Rhode Island. She dropped out after her junior year because of an issue with her student loan.

Afterwards, she worked as an intern for Vogue magazine in New York.
In 2012, Owens took a job as an administrative assistant for a private equity firm in Manhattan, later moving up to become its vice president of administration.

Early career

Degree180 and anti-conservative blog
In 2015, Owens was CEO of Degree180, a marketing agency that offered consultation, production, and planning services. The website included a blog, written by Owens, which frequently posted anti-conservative and anti-Trump content, including mockery of his penis size. In a 2015 column that Owens wrote for the site, she criticized conservative Republicans, writing about the "bat-shit-crazy antics of the Republican Tea Party," adding, "The good news is, they will eventually die off (peacefully in their sleep, we hope), and then we can get right on with the OBVIOUS social change that needs to happen, IMMEDIATELY."

Privacy violation, Gamergate, and political transformation 

Owens launched SocialAutopsy.com in 2016, a website she said would expose bullies on the Internet by tracking their digital footprint. The site would have solicited users to take screenshots of offensive posts and send them to the website, where they would be categorized by the user's name. She used crowdfunding on Kickstarter for the website.

The proposal was immediately controversial, drawing criticism that Owens was de-anonymizing (doxing) Internet users and violating their privacy. According to The Daily Dot, "People from all sides of the anti-harassment debate were quick to criticize the database, calling it a public shaming list that would encourage doxing and retaliatory harassment." Both conservatives and progressives involved condemned the website.

In response, people began posting Owens's private details online. With scant evidence, Owens blamed the doxing on progressives. After this, she earned the support of conservatives involved in the Gamergate harassment campaign, including right-wing political commentators and Trump supporters Milo Yiannopoulos and Mike Cernovich. Subsequently, Owens became a conservative, saying in 2017, "I became a conservative overnight ... I realized that liberals were actually the racists. Liberals were actually the trolls ... Social Autopsy is why I'm conservative".

Kickstarter suspended funding for Social Autopsy, and the website was never created.

Conservative activism 

By late 2017, Owens had started producing pro-Trump commentary and criticizing notions of structural racism, systemic inequality, and identity politicsall positions she herself had been publishing two years earlier. In 2017, she began posting politically themed videos to YouTube. In September 2017, she launched Red Pill Black, a website and YouTube channel that promotes black conservatism in the United States.

On November 21, 2017, at the MAGA Rally and Expo in Rockford, Illinois, Turning Point USA founder Charlie Kirk announced that Owens had been hired as the organization's director of urban engagement. Turning Point's hiring of Owens occurred in the wake of allegations of racism at Turning Point. In May 2019, Owens announced her departure as communications director for the organization.

In April 2018, Kanye West tweeted "I love the way Candace Owens thinks." The tweet was met with derision on the part of many of West's fans. In May 2018, President Donald Trump said that Owens "is having a big impact on politics in our country. She represents an ever-expanding group of very smart 'thinkers', and it is wonderful to watch and hear the dialogue going on... so good for our Country!" She registered as a Republican in 2018, after the hearings following Brett Kavanaugh's nomination as a Supreme Court judge. She objected to what she termed the "social lynching" of Kavanaugh, on the grounds that to "believe women" was the reason "our ancestors got lynched", as she told a journalist from Philadelphia magazine. "No evidence, but believe all women".

Owens has appeared on fringe conspiracy websites, such as InfoWars. In 2018, she was a guest host on Fox News, and began to distance herself from the far-right conspiracy websites, although she refused to criticize InfoWars or its hosts.

Owens hosted The Candace Owens Show on PragerU's YouTube channel. She left PragerU in 2020 to host Candace, a show on The Daily Wire.

In April 2020, Owens announced her intention to either run for office in the U.S. Senate or to be a governor, and that she would only run against an incumbent Democrat, not a Republican. She did not reveal which specific office she would run for, or in which election cycle.

During The Daily Wire'''s coverage of the 2020 U.S. Election, Owens announced she would be joining The Daily Wire and would be hosting her own show. Owens later said in a tweet, "The rumors are true. I'm moving to Nashville and joining the Daily Wire!! This was a tough secret to keep. I couldn't be more excited!!" Her podcast Candace premiered on the platform on March 19, 2021. Its episodes are filmed in front of a live studio audience and air weekly. Notable guests include former United States president Donald Trump, UFC president Dana White, and U.S. Representative Jim Jordan.

In February 2021, Owens tweeted that she was considering a run for President in 2024.

Blexit Foundation
Blexit, a term originally coined by Me'Lea Connelly, is a portmanteau of "Black" and "exit" which mimics Brexit, the word used to describe the United Kingdom's withdrawal from the European Union. The original Blexit movement was started in 2016 by Connelly with the goal of achieving Black economic independence by encouraging Black Americans to leave the traditional financial systems that have historically disadvantaged the Black community. In late 2018, Owens launched a different Blexit foundation, which featured a social media campaign to encourage African Americans (plus Latinos and other minorities) to abandon the Democratic Party and register as Republicans with the promise of freedom. At the time, 8% of Black Americans identified as Republicans.

At the launch in October 2018, Owens said that her "dear friend and fellow superhero Kanye West" designed merchandise for the movement, but the following day, West denied being the designer and disavowed the effort, saying "I never wanted any association with Blexit" and "I've been used to spread messages I don't believe in"; however, after an apology West is still putting his support behind Owens. In 2021, with dwindling donations, Owens was paid $250,000 for her foundation work.

Political views
Ideology
Owens said she had no interest in politics whatsoever before 2015, but previously identified as liberal. In 2017, she began describing herself as a conservative Trump supporter. Owens has since characterized Trump as the "savior" of Western civilization. She has argued that Trump has neither engaged in rhetoric that is harmful to African Americans, nor proposed policies that would harm African Americans. She said in October 2018 that she had never voted and had only recently become a registered Republican.The Guardian has described Owens as "ultra-conservative", and New York magazine and the Columbia Journalism Review have described her as "right-wing". The Daily Beast has called her views "far-right" and the Pacific Standard called her a member of the "alt-right", although she has rejected both terms. She was influenced by the works of Ann Coulter, Milo Yiannopoulos, Ben Carson, and Thomas Sowell.

Owens has said: "The left hates America, and Trump loves it." She has said that the left is "destroying everything through this cultural Marxist ideology."

Race relations
Owens is known for her criticism of the Black Lives Matter movement and has described Black Lives Matter protesters as "a bunch of whiny toddlers, pretending to be oppressed for attention". Owens has argued that African Americans have a victim mentality, often referring to the Democratic Party as a "plantation". She has argued that the American Left likes "black people to be government-dependent" and that black people have been brainwashed to vote for Democrats. She has argued that police violence against black people is not about racism, and referred to police killings of black people as a trivial matter to African Americans. She has characterized abortion as a tool for the "extermination" of black babies.

She has said, "Black Americans are doing worse off economically today than we were doing in the 1950s under Jim Crow", adding that this is because "we've only been voting for one party since then." She has attributed economic improvements for African Americans, such as a low unemployment rate, to Trump's presidency.

When asked if it was problematic that white supremacist groups, such as the Ku Klux Klan (KKK), support Trump, Owens answered that Antifa was more prevalent than the KKK. Owens has said that the media cover the KKK during Trump's presidency to hurt him. In a 2019 hearing on hate crimes, Owens referred to the KKK as a "Democrat terrorist organization". After the 2017 Unite the Right rally in Charlottesville, Virginia, Owens said that concern over rising white nationalism was "stupid". She has also called it "just election rhetoric" and "based on the hierarchy of what's impacting minority Americans, if I had to make a list of 100 things, white nationalism would not make the list." In 2018, Owens dismissed reports of a resurgence in hate crimes, saying "All of the violence this year primarily happened because of people on the left." That year, at least 20 people had been killed in right-wing attacks while only one had been killed in a possible left-wing attack.

During her April 2019 testimony before the House Judiciary Committee on the rise of hate crimes and white supremacists in the United States, Owens made the claim that the Southern strategy employed by the Republican Party to increase political support among white voters in the South by appealing to racism against African Americans was a "myth" that "never happened". This was disputed by several historians who said that the existence of the Southern strategy was well documented in contemporaneous sources dating back to the Civil Rights era, with historian Kevin M. Kruse, who writes about modern conservatism, calling Owens's statement "utter nonsense".

In June 2019, Owens said that African Americans had it better in the first 100 years after the abolition of slavery than they have since and that socialism was at fault.

In June 2020, Owens claimed that George Soros paid people to protest the murder of George Floyd. Shortly afterwards, she argued that George Floyd "was not a good person. I don't care who wants to spin that." She said, "The fact that he has been held up as a martyr sickens me." Then-President Trump retweeted Owens's remarks about Floyd. In a Facebook video that garnered nearly 100 million views, Owens called Floyd a "horrible human being", citing his criminal record, and called racial biases among police a "fake narrative."

On April 20, 2021, Owens claimed that the guilty verdict given to former police officer Derek Chauvin for murdering George Floyd was "mob justice" and "This was not a fair trial. No person can say this was a fair trial."

On October 3, 2022, during Yeezy SZN 9 fashion show in Paris, Owens posed for a photo with Kanye West wearing a matching shirt with the "WHITE LIVES MATTER" slogan. During Paris Fashion Week, West entered negotiations with Owens' husband, the CEO of social networking service Parler, to purchase the website.
After West posted tweets declaring he would "go Death Con 3 on Jewish people"; Owens defended West, stating that "if you are an honest person, you did not find this tweet antisemitic". Owens further accused the Anti-Defamation League of instigating antisemitism following the organization's criticism of West and Kyrie Irving. Owens' comments were made before West praised Adolf Hitler in an Infowars interview. After the interview, Parler announced that West has canceled his plans to buy the website. The Zionist Organization of America condemned Owens' defense of West, calling on her to "retract her offensive, dangerous statements."

Abortion
Owens opposes abortion. She has called abortion a tool for the "extermination of black babies".

 Women's rights 
Owens is critical of feminism. Owens described the #MeToo movement, an international movement against sexual harassment and assault, as "stupid" and said that she "hated" it. Owens wrote that the movement was premised on the idea that "women are stupid, weak & inconsequential".

In May 2018, Owens suggested that "something bio-chemically happens" to women who do not marry or have children, and she linked to the Twitter handles of Sarah Silverman, Chelsea Handler, and Kathy Griffin, saying that they were "evidentiary support" of this theory. Silverman responded: "It seems to me that by tweeting this, you would like to maybe make us feel badly. I'd say this is evidenced by ur effort to use our twitter handles so we would see. My heart breaks for you, Candy. I hope you find happiness in whatever form that takes." Owens responded, accusing Silverman of supporting terrorists and crime gangs.

LGBT rights
On July 28, 2017, Owens stated she was in favor of banning transgender individuals who are undergoing sex reassignment surgery from serving in the United States military, but said that she did not oppose fully transitioned transgender individuals serving in the military. In April 2022, she called The Walt Disney Company "child groomers and pedophiles" and called for the boycott of the company, after Disney announced its opposition to Florida's Parental Rights in Education Act, commonly referenced as the "Don't Say Gay" legislation.

In May 2022, she falsely claimed on Twitter that the gunman, involved in the Robb Elementary School shooting, could be transgender and baselessly said that he was "cross-dressing". According to Owens, this was evidence that "there were plenty of signs that he was mentally disturbed".

In June 2022, Owens described Drag Queen Story Hour as "child abuse", arguing that parents who take their children to a drag queen story hour "are underqualified to have children" and "should have their children taken away from them."

In December 2022, Owens argued that society would benefit by discriminating more against transgender and non-binary individuals.

Welfare
Owens opposes welfare programs, saying that they are a Democratic Party tool to keep black Americans dependent upon the government.

Immigration
Owens is a proponent of the Mexico–United States barrier, and believes undocumented immigrants to the United States should be immediately deported.

In 2018, Owens warned that "Europe will fall and become a Muslim-majority continent by 2050. There has never been a Muslim-majority country where sharia law was not implemented." She suggested that the United States would then be "forced to save" the British.

 2020 election 
After Joe Biden won the 2020 election and Donald Trump refused to concede, Owens promoted Trump's claims of mass fraud, saying, "the American election was clearly rigged."

 Climate change 
She has claimed that global warming is not "real", while in 2021 promoted paid ads on Facebook, calling the US government "modern doomsayers" who have been wrongly predicting climate crises for decades.

 Legal issues 
During an Instagram livestream on June 22, 2021, Owens made accusations about former Republican congressional candidate Kimberly Klacik, accusing her of money laundering, tax fraud, illegal drug use, and misusing campaign funds. Owens also said that Klacik is a "madame" who recruits strippers for a strip club owned by her husband. Owens said she found out about this after talking with a woman who claimed to have worked as a stripper at Klacik's strip club.

Klacik denied the allegations and repeatedly asked for Owens to take down the video, which she refused to do. In July, Klacik filed a lawsuit against Owens seeking $20 million for defamation and claiming that the allegations have resulted in Klacik losing political support from donors, being removed from public events, a book deal cancellation, and harassment of Klacik and her family. In a statement, Jacob S. Frenkel, Klacik's attorney, said: "The defendant chose to use her huge social media platform to attack a respected Baltimore political figure" and that "We are using the proper forum — the power of the courts — to respond." The suit was dismissed with prejudice in December 2022.

In April 2022, a class-action lawsuit was filed in Florida against the LGBcoin cryptocurrency company, Owens, stock car racing driver Brandon Brown, and NASCAR alleging that the defendants made false or misleading statements about the LGBcoin and that the founders of the company had engaged in a pump and dump scheme.

 Controversies 
 Dispute with family of Mollie Tibbetts 
In August 2018, Owens had a dispute with Sam Lucas, cousin of Mollie Tibbetts, who had been murdered by Cristhian Bahena Rivera, a 24-year-old Mexican illegal immigrant. Tibbetts's cousin said that Owens had exploited Tibbetts's death for "political propaganda". Owens responded by describing Lucas's criticism as a "strange" attack on Trump supporters. Later that month, the University of Iowa's chapter of Turning Point USA criticized Owens for "public harassment" towards a member of Tibbetts's family, and the executive board members of the chapter all resigned in protest.

 Conspiracy theories 
In October 2018, during the mail bombing attempts targeting prominent Democrats, Owens took to Twitter to promote the conspiracy theory that the mailings were sent by leftists. After authorities on October 26 arrested a 56-year-old suspect who was a registered Republican and Trump supporter, Owens deleted her tweet without explanation.

Comments about Adolf Hitler

At the launch of the British offshoot Turning Point UK in December 2018, Owens made comments about Adolf Hitler. She was responding to an audience member who asked for a "long-term prognosis" about the terms "globalism" and "nationalism", Owens said:

I actually don't have any problems at all with the word "nationalism". I think that the definition gets poisoned by elitists that actually want globalism. Globalism is what I don't want. Whenever we say "nationalism" the first thing people think about, at least in America, is Hitler. You know, [Hitler] was a national socialist, but if Hitler just wanted to make Germany great and have things run well, okay, fine. The problem is that he wanted—he had dreams outside of Germany. He wanted to globalize. He wanted everybody to be German, everybody to be speaking German. Everybody to look a different way. That's not, to me, that's not nationalism.

Following heavy criticism for her comments, Owens clarified them on Twitter and in a Judiciary Committee hearing in the U.S. House of Representatives in February 2019. Owens said that "[Hitler] was a homicidal, psychopathic, maniac that killed his own people" and "[Hitler] was not a nationalist, [he] murdered his own people; a nationalist would not kill their own people". She said that the point of her comments was to say that there is "no excuse or defense ever for ... everything that [Hitler] did". She also said that her comments were about Hitler's crimes against Jews.

Owens's comments about Hitler were played in April 2019 by Representative Ted Lieu during testimony in front of the House Judiciary Committee about the issue of increasing hate crimes and white supremacy in America. Lieu said that he did not know Owens and was just going to let her own words characterize her, before playing the audio clip. Owens responded that Lieu had deliberately omitted an interviewer's question that provided critical context to her words, with the intent of misrepresenting them as an endorsement of Hitler, to smear her reputation. She concluded this testimony by stating her opinion Lieu was "assuming that black people will not pursue the full two hour clip" and that the full clip had been "purposefully extracted" in order to "create a different narrative."

Donald Trump Jr. praised Owens on Twitter for "[calling] out the Dems on their purposeful manipulation of facts for their narrative".

 Mention in Christchurch shooter's manifesto 
Brenton Harrison Tarrant, the terrorist who committed the Christchurch mosque shootings, produced a manifesto prior to committing the shootings in which he wrote that Owens had "influenced [him] above all". According to journalist Robert Evans, it was "possible, even likely" that Tarrant was a fan of Owens, considering her rhetoric against Muslim immigrants, but in context his references to her may have been an example of "shitposting" intended to provoke political conflict. For instance, the line "Though I will have to disavow some of [Owens's] beliefs, the extreme actions she calls for are too much, even for my tastes" was assessed by The Root as trolling.

Hours after the shootings, Owens posted a tweet in reaction to allegations that she inspired the mass murder, saying that she never created any content espousing her views on the Second Amendment to the United States Constitution or Islam. However, her tweet was criticized as "glib" when it was reported that she actually had posted tweets about the 2nd Amendment and Islam. She later made formal statements rejecting any connection to the terrorist.

 COVID-19 pandemic and vaccination
In April 2020, Owens said that COVID-19 deaths were overcounted; health experts said that it was more likely that COVID-19 deaths were undercounted.

Regarding a COVID-19 vaccine, she said in June 2020 that "under no circumstances will I be getting any #coronavirus vaccine that becomes available. Ever. No matter what." She also referred to Bill Gates as a "vaccine-criminal", and said that he and the World Health Organization (WHO) used "African & Indian tribal children to experiment w/ non-FDA approved drug vaccines."

On August 8, 2021, Owens said in a Facebook post that "I still have not received the COVID-19 vaccine and have not demanded that any of my employees get it either. I am proud that I committed myself to standing firm against the bribery, media propaganda, coercion, celebrity-peer pressure campaign, plus censorship... It is isn't easy to swim against such a polluted current but here I am. I trust my gut much more than trust Dr. Fauci." Also in August, Owens claimed that the Centers for Disease Control and Prevention (CDC) proposed "putting high risk people into camps to 'shield' low risk people from them".

In 2021, Owens attracted media attention when she stated that the United States should "invade Australia", saying that Australia had turned into a tyrannical Nazi-style "police state" due to its public health precautions against COVID-19, even though Australia's COVID-19 measures had overwhelming support among the Australian public. Owens said that the comments were made "in jest" and that they had been misinterpreted by the media.

Owens has promoted misinformation about COVID-19 vaccines. In a December 2021 interview, she asked Donald Trump about vaccine mandates, and he explained that he shared her views on mandates, but added that "the vaccine is one of the greatest achievements of mankind": "The ones that get very sick and go to the hospital are the ones that don't take the vaccine. But it's still their choice. And if you take the vaccine, you're protected. Look, the results of the vaccine are very good, and if you do get it, it's a very minor form. People aren't dying when they take the vaccine."

 Feud with Cardi B 
Owens has been involved in a high-profile feud with rapper Cardi B since August 2020. The feud began when Owens retweeted a clip of herself on The Ben Shapiro Show in which she criticized Cardi B's interview with then presidential candidate Joe Biden. Cardi B responded and they engaged in a highly publicized feud, with Owens insulting Cardi B's grammar and intelligence, while Cardi B insulted Owens' political stance.

The feud resurfaced in March 2021 when Owens appeared on Fox News to critique Cardi B's performance of "WAP" at the Grammy Awards. Cardi B responded and they engaged in a debate, which ended with Owens threatening to sue after Cardi B posted a screenshot of a fake tweet about Owens' husband cheating on her with her brother. Cardi B threatened to countersue for defamation, due to Owens claiming the accusations were false. Cardi B eventually deleted the accusations.

 Views on Russia and Ukraine 
Owens has promoted Russian propaganda, including the false claim that Russia created Ukraine. Her views have been promoted by the Russian embassy, after she tweeted that "Russian lives matter" while also disparaging the Black Lives Matter movement.

In March 2022, Owens claimed that Ukraine "wasn't a thing until 1989" and that it is "stupid" to suggest that Russian president Vladimir Putin is carrying out a genocide in Ukraine. In response, American journalist and historian Anne Applebaum called Owens "the face of pure ignorance" and added that "This is what happens when you know no history."

In December, during Ukrainian President Volodymyr Zelensky's visit to the United States, Owens tweeted that she wanted to "punch" him and falsely claimed his wife went on an expensive shopping spree during a diplomatic trip to Paris.

 Personal life 
In early 2019, three weeks after they met, Owens became engaged to George Farmer, an Englishman and former chairman of Turning Point UK. Farmer is also the CEO of social networking website Parler. On August 31, 2019, she and Farmer married at the Trump Winery in Charlottesville, Virginia. Owens gave birth to a boy in January 2021. She gave birth to their second child, a daughter, in July 2022.

Bibliography
 

Filmography
 The Greatest Lie Ever Sold'' (documentary, 2022)

References

Further reading

External links

1989 births
Living people
African-American activists
Activists from Connecticut
African-American bloggers
African-American women in politics
African-American women writers
American bloggers
American critics of Islam
American gun rights activists
American nationalists
American people of United States Virgin Islands descent
American podcasters
American political commentators
American women bloggers
American women podcasters
Articles containing video clips
Black conservatism in the United States
Blaze Media people
Commentary YouTubers
Connecticut Republicans
Critics of Black Lives Matter
The Daily Wire people
Female critics of feminism
Stamford High School (Stamford, Connecticut) alumni
University of Rhode Island alumni
Writers from Stamford, Connecticut
21st-century African-American women